PQ 13 was a British Arctic convoy that delivered war supplies from the Western Allies to the USSR during World War II. The convoy was subject to attack by German air, U-boat and surface forces and suffered the loss of five ships, plus one escort vessel. Fifteen ships arrived safely.

Ships
PQ 13 comprised 19 merchant ships; seven British, four American, one Polish, four of Panamanian and one of Honduran registry. It was commanded by Commodore D. A. Casey in River Afton. The convoy was escorted for the first stage of its voyage, from Scotland to Iceland, by a Local Escort Group, of two destroyers and an ASW Trawler. For the second stage, from Iceland to the Soviet Union, the Ocean escort was two destroyers and two trawlers, augmented by three whalers being transferred to the Soviet Navy. The Ocean escort was commanded by Capt. L. S. Saunders, in the cruiser . This force was intended to accompany PQ 13 at a distance until it was past Bear Island.

Action

The convoy sailed from Loch Ewe in Scotland on 10 March 1942 and arrived in Reykjavík on 16 March 1942. After the departure of three ships, bound from Loch Ewe to Reykjavík only and the first stage escort, collecting a further three ships bound from Reykjavík to Murmansk and the close escort for the voyage, PQ 13 left Reykjavík on 20 March 1942. The voyage was uneventful until 24 March, when the convoy was struck by a four-day storm, which left the convoy scattered and in disarray. Over the next few days the ships coalesced into two groups, of eight and four, with four others proceeding independently.

On 28 March the ships were sighted by German aircraft, and attacked. Raceland and Empire Ranger were sunk. The German destroyers intercepted and sank Bateau on the night of 28/29 March, before falling in with Trinidad and Fury in the early hours of 29 March. Z26 was badly damaged by Trinidad, sinking later after a combined counter-attack of Oribi, Eclipse and the Soviet destroyer Sokrushitelny, but in the course of the action Trinidad was hit by her own torpedo  (the torpedo's gyroscope froze). The remaining German ships broke off the action and Trinidad, escorted by Fury and Eclipse, limped into Kola Inlet, arriving midday on 30 March.

The ships of PQ 13 came under U-boat attack. Fury attacked an asdic contact and was credited with the destruction of  but post-war analysis found that U-585 was lost elsewhere.

By 30 March most ships had arrived at Murmansk; the last stragglers came in on 1 April. Six ships were lost in this convoy. The Germans sank five freighters. One whaler,, was  lost, probably due to heavy icing, and the cruiser, Trinidad, was damaged. Against this one  German destroyer had been sunk. Fourteen ships had arrived safely, more than two-thirds of the convoy.

Ship list
The convoy to Russia consisted of 19 freighters, a Fleet Oiler, and 3 whalers,

 ,  and  sailed with the convoy from Loch Ewe to Iceland, but didn't sail to the Soviet Union.
 Ballot, Bateau and Scottish American joined the convoy in Iceland.
 All other ships departed from Loch Ewe, for Murmansk.
 Three whalers: HMS Silja, HMS Sulla and HMS Sumba were under transfer to the Soviet Navy and would become magnetic mine minesweepers.
In Russia, HMS Silja was renamed T-107 and HMS Sumba was renamed T-106.

Convoy escorts
For the first stage, from Loch Ewe to Reykjavík, PQ 13 had a local escort of two destroyers and an ASW Trawler.

From Iceland to Murmansk the close escort consisted of the cruiser Trinidad and the destroyers Fury and Eclipse, two armed trawlers and three minesweepers.

For the final leg the convoy was supported by the local escort based at Kola; two Soviet destroyers and four RN minesweepers.

Loch Ewe  - Reykjavík: 10–16 March.
Leaving Loch Ewe in the afternoon of the 10th, the convoy was escorted by:
 Destroyer  (left the convoy on the 13th)
 Destroyer 
 ASW Trawler 
On the 11th, another escort joined the convoy:
 Destroyer 

Reykjavík  - Murmansk: 18–31 March.
Leaving Reykjavík in the morning of the 18th, the convoy was escorted by:
(left the convoy on the 23rd)
On the 23rd, other escorts joined the convoy:
 Light Cruiser  (left the convoy on the 25th)

The Barents Sea - Murmansk: 27 March - 3 April; 
On the 27th, the convoy was joined by two Soviet destroyers:
 Destroyers  and Sokrushitelney
On 28 March the convoy was assisted by the involvement of the Sixth Minesweeping Flotilla operating here. 
On the 29th Harrier went for a search for survivors of the Empire Ranger. On the 29th Speedwell attempted to intercept Harpalion, but failed to find her.  found abandoned boats of Empire Ranger on the 29th which indicated they were picked up by other boats. ( A German wireless claimed prisoners from a merchant ship, it was obvious they were from Empire Ranger)
On 30 March, Gossamer found Scottish American, Effingham and Dunboyne. But Gossamer received orders to proceed to the position of the torpedoed Indua, but failed to find her.
Hussar made contact with a group of 9 ships of PQ 13 and a whaler. Escorted by two Russian destroyers and a trawler. Oribi sighted the whaler Silja who had run out of fuel. Oribi was ordered to go to the aid of River Afton which was reported to have been hit by a U-boat. Harrier took Silja in tow and Speedwell escorted them.

On 1 April,  (also of the Sixth Minesweeping Flotilla) sailed to search for Sulla, but returned on 3 April, having failed to find her.

Convoy losses
After an attack on 28 March 1942, 16 crewmembers of Ballot left the ship in a lifeboat, were picked up by Silja and put on board Induna.

 12 of them were former crewmembers of the SS Ballot

Aftermath

New Westminster City and Empire Starlight were bombed in Murmansk port on 3 April.
New Westminster City was lost, Empire Starlight was salvaged post war and renamed Murmansk.
Harpalion and Empire Cowper were lost on the return convoy, Convoy QP 10.

 A former crewmember of New Westminster City died on this ship

Footnotes

References

 Clay Blair : Hitler's U-Boat War Vol I (1996) 
 Bernard Edwards. The road to Russia, Arctic Convoys 1942. (2002) 
 Paul Kemp : Convoy! Drama in Arctic Waters (1993) 
 Morris O. Mills. Convoy PQ13 - Unlucky for Some. 
 John L. Haynes. Frozen Fury, The Murmansk run of Convoy PQ-13. 
 
 Richard Woodman. Arctic Convoys 1941–1945. (1994)

External links
  PQ 13 at Convoyweb
 Order of Battle-PQ13
 
 SS Raceland

PQ 13
C
Naval battles of World War II involving the Soviet Union